Alix Mathurin (born 28 December 1977) better known as Kery James, is a French rapper, singer, songwriter, dancer and record producer from Orly, who was born in Guadeloupe to Haitian parents. Prior to his solo career, he was in Idéal J where he was known as Daddy Kery. He is also part of French hip hop and rap collective Mafia K-1 Fry.

Biography

Personal life 
Kery James arrived in continental France at the age of seven. His mother raised him in Orly, a suburb of Paris. He started at a young age to rap, dance, and write his own texts. The famous MC Solaar noticed him when he was only 10 years old in a cité (suburban housing estate) of Paris. He described the setting as "A place where the Islamic faith was omnipresent", then he added Ali to his name. After his conversion to Islam, it has been declared that James is a follower of the Association of Islamic Charitable Projects (AICP), known as Al-Ahbash.

The media has labelled him "the rapper repented through Islam". Kery James is aware of it, he does not deny this story. "I prefer to be the one who hold this role rather than somebody else. Numerous young Muslims are tempted to be intolerant or extremist. If I can open their eyes it is a good thing for them".

In Idéal J

At around thirteen years old, he became a member of the group Idéal Junior (later abbreviated to Idéal J). There he was known as Daddy Kery. Idéal J garnered a few singles with explicit titles like "Hardcore", "Pour une poignée de dollars" and a first album titled Original MC's sur une mission. In 1992, their single "La vie est brutale" was released showing great promise though one of the talented artists, Alter MC (who is nowadays known as Jessy Money), promptly left the group. In subsequent years while colleague DJ Mehdi progressed as a prominent producer, Kery worked extensively on writing new material, his texts reflecting a life that involved altercations with the police, street rivalries and an omnipresent fear of death.

In 1996 the band's first album under the moniker Ideal J led the group to become renowned and respected as amongst the top French rappers with well-known singles like "Ghetto français", "Show business" and "Je veux du cash". Ideal J multiplied their appearances on Maxis and as featured acts, reaching a surprising maturity with the single "J'désole mes parents" present on the compilation Nouvelle donne. However, Kery's career was put temporarily on hold in 1999 when his close childhood friend Las Montana was shot and killed. Kery took refuge in religious faith and took the name Ali as a symbol of his full conversion to Islam.

Solo career 
In October 2001, he released his solo album "Si c'était à refaire" with, among others, the tracks "28 décembre 1977", "Si c'était à refaire", "Soledad", and "Y'a pas d'couleur". This album is very personal and benefits from numerous collaborations: Nubians, Salif Keita... The rap is influenced by African, Arabic, Cuban musical influences, without forgetting the use of percussions and original instruments for this music style as the xylophone. He sings his African roots but also the problems of society like money, violence, and moral values. This album reflects the surprising maturity of Kery.

In 2004, Kery James' second album, Ma vérité continued to underline social and political militant messages taking positions on such subjects as the war in Iraq and on reality TV. However, at the same time, duets with very popular stars such as Diam's Mélanie Giorgadès and Amel Bent, started to distance him from his underground image.

In March 2008 this metamorphosis to mainstream popularity was underlined by a new album À l'ombre du show business whose title track was a collaboration with legendary French chanson star Charles Aznavour. Other tracks included Le combat continue part III, Banlieusards and Vrai Peura. On its first week of release the album reached third place on the French charts with 24,459 albums sold. For the music videos of this album, he worked with Luc Besson, Matthieu Kassovitz, J.G Biggs and Chris Macari.

Discography

Albums and EPs

Solo studio albums

Others
2013: Coffret integral

Live albums

Other albums and EPs (collaborations)
with Idéal Junior / Idéal J
1992 : La vie est brutale (Maxi-single) (credited to Ideal Junior)
1996 : O'riginal MC's sur une mission (credited to Ideal J)
1998 : Le Combat Continue (credited to Ideal J)

with Mafia K-1 Fry

1997 : Les liens sacrés
1999 : Légendaire
2003 : La cerise sur le ghetto
2007 : Jusqu'à la mort (+ reissue)

Singles

Collaborations 
(Refer to relevant section in French Wikipedia)

References

External links 
  Site officiel, sur Skyrock.com
  « J'aurais pu dire », version audio
  « J'aurai pu dire », version vidéo
  Biographie et airplays de Kery James

1977 births
Living people
French rappers
Guadeloupean musicians
Guadeloupean people of Haitian descent
Converts to Islam
French Muslims
French people of Haitian descent
Rappers from Val-de-Marne